The Maid of the Mountains is a 1932 film based on the long-running stage musical The Maid of the Mountains. It was directed by Lupino Lane.

Cast
Nancy Brown as Teresa
Harry Welchman as Baldasare
Betty Stockfeld as Angela Malona
Albert Burdon as Tonio
Garry Marsh as Beppo
Renee Gadd as Vittoria
Wallace Lupino as Crumpet
Dennis Hoey as Orsino
Gus McNaughton as General Malona
Val Guest as Party Guest

Critical reception
Perth's The West Australian wrote in November 1932, "the most important production for some time from the British International studios at Elstree, was screened to the trade in London on September 17 last and was enthusiastically received by exhibitors and the trade Press. 'The Maid of the Mountains' is, of course, the screen version of one of the most popular musical comedies the stage has known. It was directed by Lupino Lane and photographed by Claude Finese Greene, one of England's leading cameramen. Two Australian girls, Nancy Brown and Betty Stockfield, play important roles of Teresa and Angela, and Miss Brown's singing of the popular melodies is said to be most effective...The 'Daily Film Renter' says that 'The Maid of the Mountains' is a feast of melody and humour, wholesome and entertaining throughout its length. The 'Cinema' says it has sparkling comedy, charming romance, striking spectacle and lilting music effectively put over, the camera work and recording being first class. There will be large audiences for this film when it is shown in Perth next year"; whereas more recently, TV Guide concluded that "The production, unfortunately, is flat and lifeless, without any of the jauntiness needed for it to work."

References

External links

The Maid of the Mountains at BFI

1932 films
Films based on musicals
British musical films
British black-and-white films
1933 musical films
1933 films
Films shot at British International Pictures Studios
1930s British films